A&W Restaurants (also known as Allen & Wright Restaurants) is an American fast food restaurant  chain distinguished by its burgers, draft root beer and root beer floats. Being the oldest restaurant chain in America, A&W's origins date back to 1919 when Roy W. Allen set up a roadside drink stand to offer a new thick and creamy drink, root beer, at a parade honoring returning World War I veterans in Lodi, California. Allen's employee Frank Wright partnered with him in 1922 and they founded their first restaurant in Sacramento, California in 1923. The company name was taken from the initials of their last names – Allen and Wright. The company became famous in the United States for its "frosty mugs" – the mugs were kept in a freezer and filled with A&W Root Beer just before being served to customers.

Evolving into a franchise in 1926, the company today has locations in the United States and some Southeast Asian countries, serving a  fast-food menu of hamburgers, hot dogs and French fries. A number of outlets serve as drive-in restaurants that have carhops. Previously owned by Yum! Brands, the chain was sold in December 2011 to a consortium of A&W franchisees through A Great American Brand, LLC. A&W restaurants in Canada have been part of a separate and unaffiliated chain since 1972.

History

On June 20, 1919, Roy W. Allen opened his first root beer stand in Lodi, California. Four years later, A&W began when Allen and Frank Wright opened their drive-in restaurant in Sacramento, California, combining both of their initials for the name, and selling the root beer from Allen's stand. Curbside service was provided by tray boys and tray girls. In 1924, Allen purchased Frank Wright's stake in the business. In 1925, Allen began franchising the root beer, while the franchisee added the other menu items and operated at their discretion. This may have arguably been the first successful food-franchising operation. Allen sold the company in 1950 and retired.

Expansion

In the expansion years of the 1950s and 1960s, franchisees were signing 20- or 25-year contracts under the older model. The chain expanded into Canada in 1956, opening restaurants in Winnipeg and Montreal. By 1960, A&W had 2,000 restaurants. In 1963, the chain opened its first store on Okinawa. In the following years, the chain branched into other foreign markets, including the Philippines and Malaysia. The first restaurant in Malaysia (Malaya at the time) was opened by Al and Geri Lieboff, a couple from Las Vegas, who got the franchising rights for Malaya and Singapore. Setting up the chain seemed to be complicated, as they were unable to find a proper site, and in the recruitment process, Malayans had no consent in adorning Western "cabaret girl" style clothes. Already at the time of setup, kids were starting to favor chicken, burgers and hot dogs rather than rice and curry, and within the next five years, would also see a rise in new locations, to an up to 22 within five years.

Dale Mulder opened up a Lansing, Michigan, A&W franchise in 1961. Mulder added to his menu in 1963 the bacon cheeseburger after a customer made repeated orders for bacon to be added to his cheeseburger. Thus A&W is credited with inventing the bacon cheeseburger.

United Fruit Co. and United Brands Company subsidiary
In 1963, the company was sold again, followed by another sale in 1967 to United Fruit Co. conglomerate. AMK Corporation purchased United Fruit in 1970. Then AMK formed United Brands Company to hold A&W.

In 1971, A&W Beverages Inc.—a beverage subsidiary—began supplying bottled A&W products to grocery stores. The bottled products would become available nationally. In 1972, A&W's Canadian division was sold to Unilever.

In the 1970s, A&W had more stores than McDonald's, with a peak in 1974 of 2,400 units. Oshkosh, Wisconsin, franchise manager Jim Brajdic said: "Problems back then, including a lawsuit, franchisee discontent and inconsistencies in the operation, caused the chain to flounder and branches to close." A&W moved to a modern style franchise agreement which introduced royalty payments and new standards. However, as their 20- or 25-year original agreements expired, many franchisees refused the revised terms.

A&W in the 1980s began offering the Third Pounder to compete with McDonald's Quarter Pounder. As advertised, the Third beat the Quarter in taste tests and was less expensive by weight. In his 2007 memoir, former owner A. Alfred Taubman claimed research had revealed that it had been unsuccessful in part due to Americans' widespread innumeracy, specifically their inability to understand fractions: 1/3 was perceived as smaller than 1/4 (due to the smaller denominator) in spite of being a larger quantity. The burger was relaunched in 2021 as the 3/9 Pound burger, humorously attempting to capitalize on the now-popular fractions misunderstanding story.

Taubman Investment Co. subsidiary
In 1982, A. Alfred Taubman purchased A&W and placed under Taubman Investment Co. Taubman only purchased the restaurant company and not A&W Beverages. The chain dropped to fewer than 500 locations in the mid-1980s. A freeze on issuing franchises was put in place.

In 1985, the chain was struggling in Singapore, having lost its relevance to newer, larger chains, and having lost its dominance in the fried chicken area to KFC. The chain was about to amp up its operations in the Asian region, with a possible launch in Hong Kong as well as three new restaurants in Thailand.

A&W Great Food Restaurants

A new format concept, A&W Great Food Restaurants, was developed. Ten corporate-owned locations were opened to test the concept, which was a sit-down, upscale, family-theme restaurant with a large salad bar and homemade ice cream.

A restaurant in Ximending, Taiwan opened on February 22, 1986.

In 1987, the company was headquartered in Livonia, Michigan and Mulder became CEO and president. The freeze was lifted and a push occurred in 1986 that added 60 franchise units. In 1989, A&W made an agreement with Minnesota-based Carousel Snack Bars to convert that chain's 200 stores (mostly kiosks in shopping malls) to A&W Hot Dogs & More. Some A&W Hot Dogs & More are still operating.

Yorkshire Global Restaurants subsidiary
In 1995, Taubman sold A&W to Sidney Feltenstein. A&W merged with Long John Silver's to form Yorkshire Global Restaurants based in Lexington, Kentucky. Yorkshire in 2000 agreed to test multi-branded locations with Tricon Global Restaurants. By March 2002, the Yorkshire-Tricon multi-branding test consisted of 83 KFC/A&Ws, six KFC/Long John Silver's and three Taco Bell/Long John Silver's and was considered successful by the companies.

In the late 2000s, A&W added franchises with a nostalgic look and modern technology. They have a carhop design with drive-thrus and some have picnic tables.

Yum! Brands subsidiary

Yorkshire in March 2002 merged with Tricon Global Restaurants to form Yum! Brands.

The Singapore branch was taken over by KUB in September 2001, who also oversaw the restaurants in Malaysia. At the time of takeover it had twelve restaurants, but November 2002, the number had dwindled to eight. Its restaurants had already downgraded: the Ang Mo Kio restaurant shut down, the Tampines restaurant had refused to repair its air conditioning systems and cable TV was switched off in all outlets. Food sales had decreased about 5-12%.

A&W opened its first outlet in Bangladesh on December 15, 2004. There is currently one outlet in Gulshan.

Most A&W stores that opened in the U.S. during Yum!'s ownership were co-branded with another of Yum!'s chains—Long John Silver's, Pizza Hut, Taco Bell, or KFC.

A Great American Brand

In January 2011, Yum! Brands announced its intention to sell A&W along with Long John Silver's. Citing poor sales for both divisions, Yum! planned to focus on international expansion for its remaining brands, with particular emphasis on growth in China. In September 2011, Yum! announced that it would sell the chain to A Great American Brand, a consortium of various A&W franchisees in the United States and overseas. The sale was finalized on December 19, 2011, under the leadership of returning CEO Kevin M. Bazner.

In early 2013, A&W introduced its first new product in several years: a six-ounce version of its soft-serve blended dessert treat. Mini Polar Swirls were the first product to be launched on Vine. The following summer, 250 of A&W's restaurants began hand-breading their chicken tenders, moving towards higher-quality menu items and expanding their chicken category. In April 2014, the Hand-Breaded Chicken Tender Texas Toast Sandwich was added to the menu as a limited time offering, along with a campaign to create the world's longest branded hashtag. In June 2014, A&W launched two new flavors of its Polar Swirl dessert treat: Sour Patch Kids and Nutter Butter.

In October 2013, A&W opened its first new concept restaurant, A&W Burgers Chicken Floats. The new concept focuses on fresh made-to-order food and heavily emphasizes customer service. The menu features burgers made with fresh beef and a choice of toppings, hand-breaded chicken tenders, all beef hot dogs and several sides.

In April 2019, A&W returned to Singapore after a 16-year absence, its first location being at Jewel Changi Airport.

In June 2019, A&W became the first franchise restaurant chain to turn 100.

A&W announced in March 2022 that it was going to withdraw from the Thai market due to economic losses. The restaurants shut down on March 20.

There are nearly 1,000 A&W Restaurants worldwide with approximately 600 in the U.S.

Mascots

In the 1960s, a character named Chubby Chicken appeared on all Chubby burgers.

In 1963, A&W introduced four choices of hamburgers and their corresponding Burger Family members: Papa Burger, Mama Burger, Teen Burger, and Baby Burger. Each burger had a wrapper featuring a cartoon image of the corresponding character.

Rooty, the Great American Root Bear, originated in Canada in 1974 as a counter to the Ronald McDonald character of McDonald's and first appeared in the United States in 1976. However, the character's introduction was almost aborted when marketing received focus group research results that reported a poor reaction to him . In reaction, the marketing director, acting on instinct about the appeal of the character, ordered the researcher to return to Toronto with the cover story that he never presented the report. The researcher complied and Rooty was presented to the franchisees as is. Rooty proved a popular marketing success.

Throughout the 1970s, '80s, and '90s, Rooty was the face of A&W, both the bottled drinks and the restaurant chain, on television and print advertising. His presence all but disappeared in the late 1990s, but in 2011, under new ownership, Rooty came out of retirement. He has since been featured in print ads, on A&W's website, as the voice of their official Twitter account, and in a variety of YouTube and Vine videos.  In 2013, Rooty became the first mascot to have an official LinkedIn profile, which was quickly shut down as Rooty was not considered "real" by the authorities at Linkedin.

In 1998, the characters from the comic strip "Blondie", including Blondie and Dagwood Bumstead, were licensed for use at A&W franchises as part of an "All American Food" campaign.

Gallery

See also

 A&W (Canada)
 A&W Root Beer
 List of drive-in restaurants
 List of hamburger restaurants

References

External links

Companies based in Lexington, Kentucky
Privately held companies based in Kentucky
Drive-in restaurants
Fast-food chains of the United States
Fast-food franchises
Fast-food hamburger restaurants
Hot dog restaurants
Restaurant chains in the United States
Restaurants established in 1919
Root beer stands
1967 mergers and acquisitions
1970 mergers and acquisitions
2002 mergers and acquisitions
2011 mergers and acquisitions
1919 establishments in California
Root beer